Derek Johnson (born July 16, 1971) is an American professional baseball coach. He is the director of pitching for the Cincinnati Reds of Major League Baseball (MLB). He has also served as the pitching coach for the Milwaukee Brewers of MLB and in college baseball for the Eastern Illinois Panthers, Southern Illinois Salukis, Stetson Hatters, and Vanderbilt Commodores.

Early life and career
Johnson was born in Gibson City, Illinois. He graduated from University High School in Normal, Illinois, in 1989. Johnson attended Eastern Illinois University, where he played college baseball for the Eastern Illinois Panthers.

After graduating from Eastern Illinois, he remained with the program as a pitching coach for the 1994 season. He coached in college baseball for the Southern Illinois Salukis of Southern Illinois University from 1995 through 1997, and the Stetson Hatters of Stetson University from 1998 through 2001.

Johnson was the pitching coach of the Vanderbilt Commodores baseball team from 2002 to 2012. In 2010, he was named the ABCA/Baseball America Assistant Coach of the Year. In 2012, he left Vanderbilt to be the minor league pitching coordinator for the Chicago Cubs. Prior to the 2016 season, the Milwaukee Brewers hired Johnson to be their pitching coach. After the 2018 season he quit the job with the Brewers to take on the same position with the Cincinnati Reds. Baseball America named Johnson the major league coach of the year in 2019. After the 2021 season, the Reds promoted Johnson to director of pitching, in addition to his duties as the major league pitching coach, and signed him to a contract extension.

Personal life
Johnson and his wife, Tasha, have two children. They live in Nashville, Tennessee, during the offseason.

References

External links
Vanderbilt Commodores bio

1971 births
Living people
Baseball coaches from Illinois
Baseball players from Illinois
Baseball pitchers
Cincinnati Reds coaches
Eastern Illinois Panthers baseball coaches
Eastern Illinois Panthers baseball players
Lakeland Lakers baseball players
Major League Baseball pitching coaches
Milwaukee Brewers coaches
Southern Illinois Salukis baseball coaches
Stetson Hatters baseball coaches
Vanderbilt Commodores baseball coaches